The Apple and the Arrow is a children's novella written and illustrated by Mary and Conrad Buff, published by Houghton Mifflin in 1951. It retells the legend of William Tell from the viewpoint of his 12-year-old son Walter. It is set in 1291, during the political upheaval that led to the foundation of the Old Swiss Confederacy.

The Buffs were one runner-up for the 1952 Newbery Medal from the American Library Association, recognizing the previous year's "most distinguished contribution to American literature for children". The Apple and the Arrow is called a Newbery Honor Book in retrospect and may display a silver seal.

See also

References

1951 American novels
American children's novels
Children's historical novels
Newbery Honor-winning works
Novels set in Switzerland
Fiction set in the 1290s
Novels set in the 13th century
Cultural depictions of William Tell
1291
1951 children's books
Children's novellas